Deborah L. Pauly (born July 25, 1959 in Virginia) is a perennial candidate and graduate of Trinity Law School in Orange County, CA.  She serves as a current member of the National Council of the John Birch Society, having made her reputation as a southern California Tea Party-friendly politician.

Earlier career
Pauly was appointed as a voting delegate to the California Republican Party by State Senator John Moorlach and an elected member of the Central Committee of the Republican Party of Orange County, as one of six people from the 60th Assembly District and later 68th Assembly District.

While serving as Councilwoman of the City of Villa Park, Pauly received the 2009 Woman of the Year Award from the California Legislative Women's Caucus as part of the Caucus's Women's History Month observances. Pauly served active duty in the United States Air Force as a Public Affairs Specialist.

In 2010, Pauly attracted attention by comparing the Affordable Care Act to sodomy.

A 2011 video of a protest at an Islamic charity event captured Pauly addressing a crowd outside denouncing the event as "pure, unadulterated evil" and inviting US Marines "to help these terrorists to an early meeting in paradise."

Perennial candidate

In 2012, Pauly attempted to advance her elected career by running for the 3rd district seat on the Orange County Board of Supervisors but was defeated in a landslide 68.9%-31.1% by another Republican.

In 2016, Pauly attempted to revive her dormant elected career by running for California's 68th State Assembly district but ultimately finished in 4th place with 14.1% behind two other Republicans and a Democrat in the primary election.
	
In 2019, Pauly again attempted to revive her dormant elected career by running for the 3rd district seat on the Orange County Board of Supervisors again but ultimately finished in 5th place with 5.3% of the vote behind three other Republicans and a Democrat in the special election.

Education
Pauly graduated summa cum laude with a Bachelor of Science in Mass Communications and a minor in Political Science from Southern Illinois University Edwardsville.

In 2005, Pauly was a participant in the Marian Bergeson Excellence in Public Service Series, a program created to incubate the careers of promising Republican female politicians through training, mentoring, and building networking relationships.

She is currently a full-time law student at Trinity Law School.

Drunk driving

While driving a Porsche 911, Pauly was arrested for drunk driving after hitting a parked car in Anaheim, California in 2015 during her campaign for State Assembly.

Three years earlier during her campaign for Orange County Supervisor, Pauly had attempted to drive her then-husband's Porsche home when he was arrested for drunk driving, but she was prevented from doing so by the Orange Police Department because she was also drunk.

Electoral history

2012

2016

2019

References

1959 births
Living people
California city council members
Women city councillors in California
California Republicans
John Birch Society members
21st-century American women